Zhi-Quan (Tom) Luo (Chinese: 罗智泉; pinyin: Luó Zhìquán) is Vice President (Academic), Director of Shenzhen Research Institute of Big Data and Director of CUHK(SZ)-Tencent AI Lab Joint Laboratory on Machine Intelligence.

Education and experience 
Luo was born in November 1963 in Nanchang, China. He received his B.Sc. degree in Applied Mathematics from the Peking University, China, in 1984. He was then selected by a joint AMS-SIAM committee and the Ministry of Education of China for graduate study in the United States (S.S. Chern Program). After studying at the Nankai Institute of Mathematics, Tianjin, China, for one year, he went to study at the MIT and obtained a Ph.D. degree in Operations Research in 1989, under the supervision of John Tsitsiklis.

From 1989 to 2003, he was on the faculty in the Department of Electrical and Computer Engineering, McMaster University, Canada where he eventually served as the department head and was awarded a Canada Research Chair (Tier I) in Information Processing. From 2003 to 2014, Luo served as a full professor at the Department of Electrical and Computer Engineering, University of Minnesota and held ADC Chair in digital technology. Currently, Luo serves as the Vice President (Academic) of the Chinese University of Hong Kong, Shenzhen, and concurrently the Director of Shenzhen Research Institute of Big Data and also the Director of CUHK(SZ)-Tencent AI Lab Joint Laboratory on Machine Intelligence.

Luo was elected as a Foreign Member (Canadian Citizenship) of the Chinese Academy of Engineering (CAE) in 2021.

Luo received the 2010 Farkas Prize from the INFORMS Optimization Society for outstanding contributions to the field of optimization. In 2018, he was awarded the prize of Paul Y. Tseng Memorial Lectureship in Continuous Optimization. He also received three Best Paper Awards from the IEEE Signal Processing Society in 2004, 2009 and 2011 respectively, and a 2011 Best Paper Award from the EURASIP. Luo is a Fellow of the Institute of Electrical and Electronics Engineers (IEEE) and a Fellow of the Society for Industrial and Applied Mathematics (SIAM). In 2014, he was elected to the Royal Society of Canada, the highest honor a Canadian scholar can achieve in the Arts, Humanities and Sciences. In 2016, he was elected to the Leading Talent Program of Guangdong Province. 

Luo’s research mainly addresses mathematical issues in information sciences, with particular focus on the design, analysis and applications of optimization algorithms. Luo consults regularly with industry on topics related to signal processing and digital communication. Luo was the semi-plenary speaker for the International Symposium on Mathematical Programming in 2003 and IEEE CDC conference in 2011, the distinguished lecturer for the IEEE Sensor Array and Multichannel Signal Processing Workshop in 2006, the plenary speaker for the IEEE Signal Processing Advance for Wireless Communications (SPAWC) Workshop in 2013, and IEEE Signal Processing Theory and Methods Workshop in 2014. Luo has served as Chair of the IEEE Signal Processing Society Technical Committee on Signal Processing for Communications (SPCOM). He was Editor in Chief for IEEE Transactions on Signal Processing from 2012 to 2014 and served as the Associate Editor for many internationally recognized journals, including Mathematics of Operations Research, Management Science, Mathematical Programming and others.

Notes

External links 

1963 births
Living people
Chinese electronics engineers